Arthana Binu (born 22 February 1995) is an Indian actress who works in Tamil, Malayalam, and Telugu film industries. Coming from  Thiruvananthapuram, Kerala, she made her debut in the 2016 Telugu film Seethamma Andalu Ramayya Sitralu. She is known for films such as Mudhugauv (2016), Thondan (2017), Semma  (2018) and Kadaikutty Singam (2018).

Early life 
Arthana born as the daughter of actor Vijayakumar and Binu Daniel. The couple later got divorced. She completed her schooling at Sarvodaya Vidyalaya, Trivandrum. She started anchoring in TV Channels in Malayalam at her 11th grade of schooling. After completing her school life, she joined Bachelor of Journalism, Mass Communication and Video Production at Mar Ivanios College, Thiruvananthapuram.

Even before she graduated, Arthana began her career as a model. Her profile increased by anchoring Smart Show, an entertainment and popular game show organized by Sreekandan Nair and broadcast by Flowers TV.

Career 
In 2015, she made her first camera presence through the game show Smart show on Flowers TV as a co-host to Sreekandan Nair.

Arthana made her acting debut in 2016 when she was in her second year of college, in the Telugu romantic comedy film Seethamma Andalu Ramayya Sitralu (2016) along with Raj Tarun, directed by Srinivas Gavireddy. In the same year she made her Malayalam debut along with Gokul Suresh in Mudhugauv (2016), a Malayalam caper-comedy film.

Then she entered into Tamil Film Industry by  Thondan (2017) directed by Samuthirakani, along with Vikranth, Samuthirakani and Sunaina. Continued by Semma (2018) which she had signed before Thondan, with G. V. Prakash Kumar under director Pandiraj's Production, got released on 25 May 2018 and Arthana got positive reviews for her performance. After watching the movie director Pandiraj castes her in his next directorial venture with Karthi in the Tamil family drama film Kadaikutty Singam (2018).

Currently she is doing as female lead in Vennila Kabaddi Kuzhu 2 Tamil action sports drama film directed by Selva Sekaran and  written by director Suseenthiran, a sequel  to successful  2009 film Vennila Kabadi Kuzhu.

Filmography

References

External links
 
 

Living people
Actresses from Thiruvananthapuram
Indian film actresses
Female models from Kerala
Actresses in Malayalam cinema
Actresses in Telugu cinema
Actresses in Tamil cinema
1997 births